Wheelerwood is an unincorporated community in Cerro Gordo County, in the U.S. state of Iowa.

History
Wheelerwood contained a post office from 1900 until 1906. The community was named for J. S. Wheeler, a local landowner.

Wheelerwood's population was 41 in 1925.

References

Unincorporated communities in Cerro Gordo County, Iowa
Unincorporated communities in Iowa